Sinomenine or cocculine is an alkaloid found in the root of the climbing plant Sinomenium acutum which is native to Japan and China. The plant is traditionally used in herbal medicine in these countries for rheumatism and arthritis. However, its analgesic action against other kinds of pain is limited. Sinomenine is a morphinan derivative, related to opioids such as levorphanol and the non-opioid cough suppressant dextromethorphan. Its anti-rheumatic effects are thought to be primarily mediated via release of histamine, but other effects such as inhibition of prostaglandin, leukotriene and nitric oxide synthesis may also be involved.

See also 
 Hasubanan
 Oreobeiline

References 

Benzylisoquinoline alkaloids
Morphinans
Phenols
Phenol ethers
Ethers
Ketones
GABAA receptor antagonists
Glycine receptor antagonists